Lozio is a town and comune in the province of Brescia, in Lombardy. Neighbouring communes are Cerveno, Malegno, Ossimo and Schilpario (BG).

References

Cities and towns in Lombardy